Baekhwasan (백화산; 白華山) is the name of three mountains in South Korea:

Baekhwasan (Goesan/Mungyeong)
Baekhwasan (Yeongdong/Sangju)
Baekhwasan (Chungcheongnam-do)